The CSI Immanuel Cathedral, Ernakulam, under the Diocese of Cochin of the Church of south India, was dedicated more than 103 years ago.

History
The site, originally costing 56 cents, was purchased in 1905 by Rev. J.H. Bishop and the original church was built largely through his efforts, in memory of Rev, E.B. Russel who was the missionary of the Church of England in Travencore - Cochin from 1897 to 1899 and Rev. A.B. Sealy, who was the principal of Maharaja's College. Ernakulam from 1874 to 1892 and also director of education of the Cochin State. A brass tablet in memory of those two missionaries was affixed in the chapel wall and the new church became known as the Russell Sealy Memorial church. Technical advice on the construction of the church was provided by Mr. Browning, son-in-law of Rev. Sealy, who was the chief engineer of the Cochin State.

The foundation stone of the new church was laid by governor of Madras, Sir Arthur Lawley and the church was dedicated for divine worship by the Most Rev. R.S. Coplestone, metropolitan of India and Ceylon, at a benediction service held on 11 February 1908.

Initially the church was attached to Trichur pastorate as there were only a few families that took up permanent membership in the new church. There were therefore no pastors in charge of the parish from 1908 to 1927; the church was administered by the missionaries in Trichur and the parish duties carried out by lay workers, the first of whom was P. P. Lazarus of Trichur. The first graduate catechist of the parish was Mr. K.S. George. He was followed by Mr. George Koshy. After working as catechist for a few years, Koshy left to study at the Serampore Divinity College; he was to return as pastor of parish in 1952.

In 1928 Ernakulam was made a separate parish with Mulavukad as its outstation. Rev C. K. John was the first priest of the new parish and served initially as catechist, but after a few years was ordained as deacon and then, still later, as the presbyter. The list of pastors who served after him, all of whom rendered yeoman service, is appended to this page.

The church celebrated its Silver anniversary in 1933 during the tenure of Rt. Rev E.A.L Moore, bishop of the diocese of Travencore - Cochin.

In 1939 the church opened clinics in country boats. These 'Floating Dispensaries', as they were called, each under the charge of a doctor, provided medical aid to out-of-the-way places in waterlogged areas. The venture was, by all accounts, a great success and continued for about 20years.

The foundation stone for the parish hall was laid in 1945 by Sir George Boag, De wan of Cochin state in the presence of the most Rev Foss Westcott, metropolitan of India and Ceylon and Rt. Rev. C.K Jacob. bishop of the diocese of Travencore Cochin. The hall was, however, completed only in 1950. The funds were raised by the ladies of the church, who had been given the responsibility by the vicar, Rev N. I Joseph. The hall is named the Wescott Hall in the honour of the metropolitan, who served the needs of the congregation for over 60 years, it was finally pulled down in 2008 when the construction of the present church was under way.

In 1947, soon after the formation of the Church of South India, the church established its youth league, now called the Youth Fellowship. Though the initiative of Rev. George Koshy, the Immanuel Church brought out its first newsletter in 1955. The tradition continues, though from 2005 the name was changed to Immanuel.

In 1956, the church established the Poor Fund, an initiative that has stood witness to Christianity for more than half a century.

The church celebrated its Golden Jubilee in 1958 when Rt. Rev. Rechard Lipp was Bishop in the Diocese of North Kerala. Coinciding with the Golden Jubilee of the church, the choir switched the colour of its robes from black to scarlet.

In the meantime the membership of the church, had grown substantially from the handful of families that were its first permanent members. By the sixties the building was found inadequate to accommodate worshippers during the divine services. In 1970 during the tenure of Rev. K.C. Seth, the building was extended to the front porch; a new porch and belfry was built. This extended part of the building was dedicated by the Most. Rev. P. Solomon, Moderator of the Church of South India.

The Platinum Jubilee of the church was celebrated in 1982 when Rt. Rev. K.C. Seth was Bishop in the Diocese of North Kerala. The Most Rev. I. Jesudasan, then Moderator of the Church of South India was the chief celebrant. During this period Archbishop of Canterbury Most Rev. Rev. Robert Runcie visited our Church.

Over time, with membership ever increasing the extension became inadequate and it was decided to bifurcate the membership and to construct a new church the CSI Christ Church in Elamkulam in Ernakakulam. The new church was dedicated on 6th Jan 1991 bu the Rt. Rev. Dr. P.G.D

Worship timings
Every Sunday
 Holy Communion - English - at 7.30 AM
 Holy Communion - Malayalam - at 9.30 AM
 Tamil - at 3.30 PM (Holy Communion - 2nd Sunday)
 Evening English Service - at 6.00 PM (Holy communion on 1st & 3rd Sundays)

Lay workers (1908-1927)

Vicars

Asst. Vicars

Secretaries

Sextons

Other C.S.I Churches in Kochi area
 CSI Holy Trinity Church, Union Christian College, Aluva.
 CSI St John the Baptist Church, Aluva.
 CSI Christ Church, Elamkulam.
 CSI St Francis Church, Fort Kochi.
 CSI Ascension Church, Kakkanad.
 CSI All Saints' Church, Kalamassery.

See also

 Association of Theologically Trained Women of India (ATTWI)
 Christianity in India
 Christianity in Tamil Nadu
 Church of North India
 Church of South India Boys Higher Secondary School
 Communion of Churches in India
 Serampore College
 St. Thomas Christians
 Telugu Christian
 CSI Church in Australia

References

Church of South India church buildings in India
Churches in Ernakulam district